Gunay Aghakishiyeva (born 12 May 1990 in Baku) is an Azerbaijani taekwondo practitioner competing in the featherweight division.

Gunay Aghakishiyeva won a silver medal at the 2013 Islamic Solidarity Games held in Palembang, Indonesia. At the 2014 European Taekwondo Championships held in Baku, Azerbaijan, she won the bronze medal in the featherweight division.

References

1990 births
Living people
Azerbaijani female taekwondo practitioners
Taekwondo practitioners at the 2015 European Games
European Games competitors for Azerbaijan
European Taekwondo Championships medalists
Islamic Solidarity Games competitors for Azerbaijan
Islamic Solidarity Games medalists in taekwondo
21st-century Azerbaijani women